Mount Duvall is an ice-covered mountain,  high, standing close west of Fisher Bastion on the north side of Solomon Glacier, in the Royal Society Range, Victoria Land. It was named by the Advisory Committee on Antarctic Names (1994) after Thomas L. Duvall Jr., who conducted research, along with John W. Harvey and Martin Pomerantz, in helioseismology at the South Pole Station from 1980.

References 

Mountains of Victoria Land
Scott Coast